Paradasys is a genus of gastrotrichs belonging to the family Cephalodasyidae.

The species of this genus are found in Northern Europe, India.

Species:

Paradasys bilobocaudus 
Paradasys hexadactylus 
Paradasys lineatus 
Paradasys littoralis 
Paradasys nipponensis 
Paradasys pacificus 
Paradasys subterraneus

References

Gastrotricha